Bálint Böröczky (born 18 March 1994) is a Hungarian professional footballer who plays for FC Veszprém.

Club statistics

Updated to games played as of 18 November 2014.

References

External links
Profile at MLSZ 
Profile at HLSZ 

1994 births
Living people
People from Pápa
Hungarian footballers
Association football midfielders
Lombard-Pápa TFC footballers
Nemzeti Bajnokság I players
Sportspeople from Veszprém County